Lycosa dacica is a wolf spider species found in Romania. It was first described by Pavesi in 1898. According to the Catalogue of Life species Lycosa dacica does not have known subspecies.

See also 
 List of Lycosidae species

References

External links 

Lycosidae
Spiders of Europe
Spiders described in 1898